Disney's Yacht Club Resort is a New England nautical-themed resort at Walt Disney World. First opened on November 5, 1990, it is one of several Epcot Area Resorts. Disney's Yacht Club is located next to a sister resort, Disney's Beach Club Resort, and across Crescent Lake from Disney's BoardWalk Resort. The resort is owned and operated by Disney Parks, Experiences and Products. It was designed by the firm of the 2011 Driehaus Prize winner, Robert A.M. Stern Architects.

Resort features
Disney's Yacht and Beach Club resorts share resources, including staff and management. Boat transportation from the resort runs to Epcot and Disney's Hollywood Studios, as well as the BoardWalk and the Walt Disney World Swan & Walt Disney World Dolphin resorts. The resort is about five minutes walking distance from Epcot and roughly 15 minutes walking to Disney's Hollywood Studios. Guests can use the back entrance to Epcot through the World Showcase between the France and the UK Pavilions.

The Yacht Club is home to a  Convention Center shared with the Beach Club.

Dining

Yachtsman Steakhouse - A restaurant that serves steakhouse dishes with a nautical theme in a ship-shaped restaurant layout. It serves dinner only.

Ale & Compass Restaurant (formerly Captain's Grille & Yacht Club Galley) - A casual dining restaurant for breakfast, lunch, and dinner and a buffet option for breakfast only. It features similar nautical theming to that of the Yachtsman Steakhouse, but a more casual atmosphere.

Hurricane Hanna's - A poolside counter-service restaurant that serves mostly fast-food American cuisine.

Recreation
Stormalong Bay - The resorts' main pool complex which resembles a beach-side water park with its sand-bottom pools, a circular lazy river, waterfall, and the "Shipwreck"; a large replica of a ship wreck with one of the highest resort water slides at Walt Disney World. The pool complex offers a poolside counter-service restaurant and bar, a children's shallow area, and an elevated tanning deck. It is centrally located between both resorts facing Crescent Lake.

Quiet pool - The "quiet pool" is located on the far end of the resort in a garden area.

Lafferty Place Arcade - An arcade located next to the Beaches and Cream Soda Shop

Ship Shape Health Club - A  health and fitness center. The health club is centrally located between both the Beach Club Resort and the Yacht Club Resort and offers fitness equipment. The center also offers massage therapy.

Bayside marina - The resort's lakeside marina offers a variety of watercraft available for rental including private cruises and fishing excursions.

Shipwreck Beach - The resorts offer a lake-side white sand beach on Crescent Lake. Different Activities are also held on the beach including Movie Nights and Campfire Sing-Alongs.

Tennis - The resort also has tennis courts.

Convention center
It is primarily accessible from the Yacht Club Resort via a covered walkway to its Lobby. The convention center received a  expansion and renovation that finished and opened early 2019.

References

External links

 

Convention centers in Florida
Hotel buildings completed in 1990
Hotels established in 1990
Yacht Club Resort
Robert A. M. Stern buildings
1990 establishments in Florida